Chirayinkeezhu Ramakrishnan Nair (1 August 1929 – 10 January 1994) was a Malayalam lyricist from Kerala. He also served as a lecturer in Madras Presidency College. He penned the lyrics for around 30 Malayalam movies.

Ramakrishnan alias Chirayinkeezhu Ramakrishnan nair started writing poetry at a young age. His friendship with Prem Nazir gave him the opportunity to write songs for Malayalam films. His first movie, Innale Innu, was released in 1977. He wrote the song 'Swarnayavanikakkullile Swapnanadakam' from the film. After onwards, he went to write lyrics for around 20 songs and 100 songs. He died aged 64 on 10 January 1994, after prolonged illness.

References

Malayalam-language lyricists
Poets from Kerala
1994 deaths
1929 births
Indian lyricists
Indian male poets
20th-century Indian poets
20th-century Indian male writers
Academic staff of Presidency College, Chennai